Harry Seymour Reid (30 June 1866 - 18 January 1943) was Bishop of Edinburgh from 1929 until 1939.

Life

He was educated at Loretto School and  Glasgow University. He was ordained in 1884 and began his career with a curacy at St John the Evangelist, Edinburgh. After this he was Senior Chaplain at St Mary's Cathedral, Edinburgh and then held incumbencies at St Mark's, Portobello, Edinburgh and St Paul's, York Place in the same city. In 1919 he became Dean of Edinburgh before his appointment to the episcopate.

He is buried near the south-west corner of St John's churchyard in Edinburgh.

Family

Reid married first Elizabeth Maria (1857-1898), whose grave is pictured. He married secondly, at St. John's Mission church in Edinburgh on 24 June 1902, to Edith Tait, daughter of Professor Peter Tait.

References

People educated at Loretto School, Musselburgh
Alumni of the University of Glasgow
Deans of Edinburgh
Bishops of Edinburgh
20th-century Scottish Episcopalian bishops
1943 deaths
1866 births